The 2010–11 North of Scotland Cup was won by Forres Mechanics.

2010–11 Competing Clubs
Brora Rangers
Clachnacuddin
Forres Mechanics
Fort William
Golspie Sutherland
Halkirk Utd
Inverness Caledonian Thistle
Lossiemouth
Muir of Ord
Nairn County
Rothes
Strathspey Thistle
Thurso
Wick Academy

First round

North Section

East Section

Second round

North Section

East Section

Semi finals

North Section

East Section

Final

References 

North of Scotland Cup seasons
North of Scotland Cup